Club Deportivo Sula  is a Honduran football club based on La Lima, Honduras.

History
They were promoted to first division in 1984–85, the next season they bought Juventud Morazanica's franchise and changed their name to Juventud de Sula. In 1986–87 they changed their name back to just Sula and stayed like that until they were relegated in 1990–91.

In 2011, Sula reemerged in Liga de Ascenso (just like Honduras-Progreso), causing happiness amongst old fans in La Lima. They immediately won their first game against Villanueva F.C.

Before the beginning of the professional league, Sula won an amateur title in 1950–51.

Achievements
Segunda División
Winners (1): 1983

Amateur League
Winners (1): 1951–52

Cortés Championship
Winners (3): 1950, 1951, 1954

League performance

 In 1985–86 as Juventud de Sula.

Trivia
 Sula was the first Honduran club to play outside Honduras in 1939, they defeated Tipografía Nacional in Guatemala 2–1 with two goals from Neto Budde and Raúl Guardiola

References

Sula